Mahammad Asadov (5 December 1941 – 20 November 1991) was the State Advisor to the President of Azerbaijan and Minister of Internal Affairs of the Republic of Azerbaijan.

Early years
Asadov was born on 5 December 1941 in Baharlı village of Zangilan Rayon of Azerbaijan Republic. He completed his secondary education in Mincivan village and entered Baku Statistics College in 1958. Upon completion of the college, Asadov returned to Zangelan Rayon and worked as an inspector until 1961. From 1961 through 1964, he served in the Soviet Army. He then worked in Sumqayit until 1965, when he got enrolled in the Finance Department of Azerbaijan State University. From 1965 until 1968, Asadov worked as Manager Assistant and accountant and in 1968 was appointed head of the Production Department of Sumgayit Party Committee. In 1970, he graduated from Finance Department of Azerbaijan State Economic University. Between 1978 and 1980, Asadov served as the Chairman of Agsu Rayon Executive Committee.

Political career
In 1980, he got enrolled in Moscow Security Forces Academy, graduating cum laude in 1982. He then worked at the Ministry of National Security of Azerbaijan for a short time. Between 1983 and 1986, he was the First Secretary of Regional Party Committee of Beylagan Rayon; between 1986 and 1988 he served in administrative positions and was then the First Secretary of Agdash (1988–89) and Quba raions (1989–90). 

On 23 May 1990 Asadov was appointed Minister of Internal Affairs of Azerbaijan SSR. On 5 November he was promoted to General Major and given additional responsibilities of the State Advisor to the President of Azerbaijan.

Death
He was killed in a helicopter which was shot down by Armenian forces on 20 November 1991 near the Karakend village of Khojavend district in Nagorno-Karabakh, Azerbaijan along with other high-ranking officials from Azerbaijan, Russia and Kazakhstan. There were no survivors of the crash. Asadov was buried at the Honorary Cemetery in Baku.

See also
1991 Azerbaijani Mil Mi-8 shootdown
Internal Troops of Azerbaijan
Law enforcement in Azerbaijan

References

People from Karabakh
1941 births
1991 deaths
Political office-holders in Azerbaijan
Government ministers of Azerbaijan
Azerbaijani generals
National Heroes of Azerbaijan
People from Zangilan District
Azerbaijani military personnel of the Nagorno-Karabakh War
Victims of aircraft shootdowns